Derventa is a city located in Republika Srpska, an entity of Bosnia and Herzegovina. It is situated in the Posavina region, northwest of the city of Doboj. As of 2013, the town has a total of 11,631 inhabitants, while the municipality has 27,404 inhabitants.

Geography
The Derventa municipality borders with Brod, Modriča, Doboj, Stanari, Prnjavor and Srbac, as well as Croatia across the Sava river.

The town of Derventa lies on the river Ukrina, and roads lead from it to Brod, Kotorsko (Doboj), Prnjavor (Banja Luka) and Srbac.

The town has a suburb called Derventski Lug which has grown substantially in recent years due to growth of Municipality.

History
From 1929 to 1939, Derventa was part of the Vrbas Banovina and from 1939 to 1941 of the Banovina of Croatia within the Kingdom of Yugoslavia.

Prior to the Bosnian War, there was a significant population of ethnic Croats within Derventa, while the majority were Bosniaks. When the war started, some of the prominent Serbs within the town took up certain positions of power. During the war, the major fighting factions were the HVO and the VRS, with some units from the ARBiH participating in the conflict. The HVO lost control of Derventa after Operacija Koridor '92 by the VRS and they were pushed up north, and as a result of the battle most of the Croats and Bosniaks were ethnically cleansed from the area, and Serb refugees from war-affected regions shortly settled in the town.

After the Dayton Agreement in 1995, some Bosniak and Croat refugees returned to Derventa.

Settlements

Aside from the town of Derventa, the municipality and consists of 56 following settlements:

Demography

Population

Ethnic composition

Economy
The following table gives a preview of total number of registered people employed in legal entities per their core activity (as of 2018):

Sports
The most popular sport in Derventa is football and the town has a long footballing tradition. Derventa's first football club was formed in 1919 under the name FK Dečko. Several other sports associations formed in Derventa prior to the outbreak of the Second World War. The war caused the dissolution of all previous clubs in Derventa and the formation of FK Tekstilac, who merged with FK Dečko. FK Tekstilac still competes today in the First League of the Republika Srpska and its home ground is Gradski Stadion FK Tekstilac, which has an attendance capacity of around 500 spectators. Derventa's most successful sports team is RK Derventa, which currently competes in the Premier league of Bosnia and Herzegovina for handball, which is the nation's top professional handball division. Derventa is known throughout the region for its tradition of handball excellence, creating many great players as well as having a very successful club given that it is such a small town.

Notable people

Vedran Ćorluka (born 1986), footballer
Mile Kitić (born 1952), folk singer
Miroslav Pejić (born 1986), footballer
Mario Tokić (born 1975), footballer
Ivan Martić (born 1990), footballer
Abaz Arslanagić (born 1944), handball player and coach
Muhamed Memić (born 1960), handball player
Sulejman Medenčević (born 1963), cinematographer
Senad Lupić (born 1966), footballer
Zoran Rankić (1935–2019), actor
Alojz Benac (1914–1992), archaeologist

Twin Town – Sister City

Derventa is twinned with:
 Pinerolo, Italy

References

External links

 

 
Populated places in Derventa
Municipalities of Republika Srpska